State Road 267 (NM 267) is a  state highway in the U.S. state of New Mexico. NM 267's southern terminus is at U.S. Route 70 (US 70) in Portales, and the northern terminus is at  US 60 and US 84 just east of the village of Melrose.

Route description
NM 267 begins at US 70 in Portales. Before leaving the city of Portales it serves the western terminus of NM 236. NM 267 then passes through the village of Floyd. After leaving Floyd it serves the eastern terminus of NM 330 then the western terminus of NM 236. It then crosses from Roosevelt County to Curry County. It then ends at US 60 and US 84 just east of the village of Melrose.

History
Created in 1988 during the New Mexico 1988 Highway Renumbering as a former part of NM 88.

Major intersections

See also

References

http://www.steve-riner.com/nmhighways/NM251-300.htm

External links

267
Transportation in Curry County, New Mexico
Transportation in Roosevelt County, New Mexico
1988 establishments in New Mexico